Alexander Yegorov may refer to:

 Alexander Yegorov (soldier) (1883–1939), Soviet military commander
 Alexander Valentinovich Yegorov (born 1951), Russian diplomat and ambassador
 Alexander Viktorovich Egorov (born 1967), Russian artist
 Aleksandr Yegorov (luger) (born 1985), Russian luger
 Alexander Yegorov (politician) (1904–1988), a Soviet politician
 Alexander Anatolyevich Yegorov (born 1972), Russian football referee
 Aleksandr Egorov (swimmer), Russian swimmer